Cymbiola nivosa is a species of sea snail, a marine gastropod mollusk in the family Volutidae, the volutes.

Subspecies
 Cymbiola nivosa nivosa (Lamarck, 1804)
 Cymbiola nivosa oblita (E. A. Smith, 1909)

Description

Distribution

References

External links
 Lamarck [J.B.P.A. de]. (1804). Mémoire sur deux espèces nouvelles de volutes des mers de la Nouvelle-Hollande. Annales du Muséum d'Histoire Naturelle. 5: 154–160, pl. 12

Volutidae
Gastropods described in 1804